Cornelis van Staveren (14 June 1889 in Leimuiden – 10 April 1982, Oude Wetering) was a sailor from the Netherlands, who represented his native country at the 1928 Summer Olympics in Amsterdam. Van Staveren, as crew member on the Dutch 8 Metre Hollandia, took the 2nd place with helmsman Johannes van Hoolwerff and fellow crew members: Lambertus Doedes, Henk Kersken, Gerard de Vries Lentsch and Maarten de Wit.

Sources
 
 
 

1889 births
1982 deaths
People from Kaag en Braassem
Dutch male sailors (sport)
Sailors at the 1928 Summer Olympics – 8 Metre
Olympic sailors of the Netherlands
Medalists at the 1928 Summer Olympics
Olympic medalists in sailing
Olympic silver medalists for the Netherlands
Sportspeople from South Holland
20th-century Dutch people